Arctia seitzi is a moth of the  family Erebidae. It was described by Andreas Bang-Haas in 1910. It is found in central Asia, including Kazakhstan and Kirghizia.

This species was formerly a member of the genus Acerbia, but was moved to Arctia along with the other species of the genera Acerbia, Pararctia, Parasemia, Platarctia, and Platyprepia.

Subspecies
Arctia seitzi seitzi
Arctia seitzi micropuncta Saldaitis, Ivinskis & Witt, 2004 (Kirghizia)

External links

Moths described in 1910
Arctiina
Moths of Asia